Ventanillas de Otuzco are a Peruvian archaeological site located in the district of Baños del Inca, 8 km northwest of the city of Cajamarca.Learn about VEntanillas de otuzco The crypts fulfilled its function of funerary enclosure.

Location

Chronology 
It has an antiquity of 300BCE - 200CE of the Early Intermediate period.

References

Sources

External links

Archaeological sites in Cajamarca Region
Archaeological sites in Peru